Phil Butler is a former professional rugby league footballer who played in the 1970s and 1980s.

Club career
Phil Butler made his début for the Featherstone Rovers on Saturday 12 October 1974.

References

English rugby league players
Featherstone Rovers players
Place of birth missing
Rugby league halfbacks
Year of birth missing